Bell's Brewery, Inc. is an American craft brewing company, with operations in Comstock and Kalamazoo, Michigan. Bell's brews acclaimed beers such as Hopslam Ale, Oberon Ale, and Two Hearted Ale. It operates a brewpub and a store selling merchandise and homebrewing supplies at its Kalamazoo location. Begun as a homebrewing store in 1983, and producing beer since 1985, it is the oldest existing craft brewery in Michigan and the oldest craft brewery east of Colorado. As of 2021, it was the 6th largest craft brewery in the United States, and was the largest independently owned brewery in Michigan when founder Larry Bell sold the company to Lion Little World Beverages - an Australian subsidiary of the Japanese Kirin beverage group at the end of 2021. The company also owns Upper Hand Brewery, a separately operated division in Escanaba, Michigan.

History
Larry Bell incorporated The Kalamazoo Brewing Company, Inc., in 1983 as a homebrewing supply shop in Kalamazoo, Michigan. In September 1985, the company began to sell its own beer, brewed in a  soup kettle and fermented in open fermenters covered with plastic wrap. The company produced 135 barrels in its first year. In 1993 the company opened an adjacent brewpub, the Eccentric Café. 

In 2003, Bell's opened an additional brewing facility in nearby Comstock, Michigan. The company legally changed its name in 2006 to Bell's Brewery, Inc., reflecting the name by which it was popularly known. A larger production facility in Comstock opened in 2012, increasing the company's brewing capacity from 180,000 barrels to 500,000 barrels per year.

In late 2012, the Bell family repurchased all stock held by outside investors, returning the company to full family ownership. 

The company opened Upper Hand Brewery in the Upper Peninsula city of Escanaba in 2014. This brewery produces UPA (American pale ale), Upper Hand Light (lager), Yooper Ale (pale ale), Escanaba Black Beer (black ale), Upper Hand IPA (India pale ale), and a variety of seasonal and specialty brews. Initially sold only in the U.P., it began limited distribution in the Lower Peninsula in 2020.

In 2021, Larry Bell sold his controlling share of the company to Lion Little World Beverages, an Australia-based international producer of alcoholic beverages. A subsidiary of the Japanese Kirin beverage group, Lion also owns Colorado-based New Belgium Brewing Company.

Beers
Bells produces eight year-round packaged beers, and numerous seasonal and limited-production beers. Many limited-production beers can only be found in their general store in Kalamazoo.

Honors
Two Hearted Ale (an India Pale Ale named for the Two Hearted River in the Upper Peninsula of Michigan) has been ranked by the American Homebrewers Association as one of the best beers in the United States, in its magazine Zymurgy. They rated it #2 from 2010 to 2016, and #1 from 2017 to 2019. Hopslam, a double IPA, is very popular among craft beer drinkers and sparks a backlog of demand at its yearly seasonal release; it has also placed within the Top 10.

Availability
Bell's brews its Porter, Kalamazoo Stout, Lager of the Lakes, Light Hearted Ale, Amber Ale, Two Hearted Ale, Hopsoulution Ale, and Official year-round. Several other beers are sold seasonally: Oberon Ale from late March through September (year-round in Florida, Arizona, and Puerto Rico), Best Brown Ale in September and October, Christmas Ale in November and December, and Bright White Ale (formerly Winter White Ale) from November through January. Specialty stouts such as Expedition Stout and Special Double Cream Stout, are released in autumn. Consecrator Doppelbock is released once a year. Additional beers are sold on tap at its brewpub.

Bell's beer is distributed in forty-three states, the District of Columbia, and Puerto Rico. As of 2021, the states without Bell's beer distribution are Alaska, Hawaii, Idaho, Montana, Oregon, Utah, and Washington, as well as California north of Los Angeles County.

Legal issues 
In 1998, Bell's changed the name of its flagship summer beer from Solsun to Oberon as a result of legal action by Mexican brewing company Cerveceria Cuauhtemoc Moctezuma, makers of a beer with a similar name: El Sol ("The Sun").

Bell's was temporarily pulled from the Illinois market in October 2006 when Union Beverage, its distributor to Chicago, tried to sell its distribution rights to a competitor which Larry Bell did not trust to adequately represent the brewer's full product line. In 2007 the company re-entered the market through new distributors by creating two new beer brands: Kalamazoo Royal Amber Ale and Kalamazoo Hopsoulution. In August 2008, Bell's was able to return its primary brands to the area, after Union Beverage's parent company quit the Illinois market.

References

External links
 

1983 establishments in Michigan
Companies based in Kalamazoo, Michigan
Beer brewing companies based in Michigan
Companies established in 1983